This is a  list of female tennis players  who meet one or more of the following criteria:
 Singles:
 Won at least One official Women's Tennis Association tournament.
 Won at least one Grand Slam (tennis).
 Won Gold medal Olympic Games in singles.
 Won at least one title on the Virginia Slims Circuit.

List

See also

List of male tennis players
List of sportspeople
List of WTA number 1 ranked singles tennis players
List of WTA number 1 ranked doubles tennis players
Top ten ranked female tennis players
Top ten ranked female tennis players (1921–1974)
List of Grand Slam women's singles champions

References